The 2009 Fayetteville mayoral election took place on November 8, 2009 to elect the mayor of Fayetteville, North Carolina. It saw the reelection of incumbent mayor Tony Chavonne.

Results

Primary
The primary was held October 6, 2009.

General election

References

2009
2009 North Carolina elections
2009 United States mayoral elections